Evgeny Igorevich Svechnikov (born 31 October 1996) is a Russian professional ice hockey forward for the San Jose Sharks of the National Hockey League (NHL). He was drafted 19th overall by the Detroit Red Wings in the 2015 NHL Entry Draft.

Playing career
In 2012, soon after his move to Kazan in 2010, Svechnikov began his junior career playing for Bars and Irbis, junior teams of the Ak Bars Kazan club system. He made his pro debut with Ak Bars before reaching the age of 17, during the 2013–14 season.

Svechnikov was drafted in the second round, 63rd overall, in the 2013 CHL Import Draft by the Cape Breton Screaming Eagles and committed to the organization for the 2014–15 season. In his rookie season, he finished third in club scoring, and ranked second among QMJHL rookies with 32 goals and 46 assists in 55 games. He led his team in points-per-game at 1.42. Following an outstanding rookie season, he was named to the QMJHL All-Rookie Team and featured in the CHL/NHL Top Prospects Game.

On 26 June 2015, Svechinkov was drafted 19th overall by the Detroit Red Wings in the 2015 NHL Entry Draft. On 2 October 2015 the Red Wings signed Svechinkov to a three-year, entry-level contract.

During the 2015–16 season, Svechnikov recorded 32 goals and 47 assists in 50 games. His 79 points ranked second on the team and tied for 18th in the QMJHL, while his 47 assists placed 17th and his 13 power play goals tied for eighth.

On 24 April 2016, Svechnikov was assigned to the Grand Rapids Griffins of the American Hockey League (AHL). On 3 April 2017, Svechnikov was recalled by the Red Wings. Prior to being recalled he recorded 18 goals and 26 assists in 68 games for the Griffins. He led all Griffins rookies in points and ranked among the top AHL rookies in goals (T10th), points (T6th), game-winning goals (T1st) and shots (2nd). He made his NHL debut for the Red Wings later that night in a game against the Ottawa Senators. In his debut, he scored the game-winning goal in a seven-round shootout. He was assigned to the Griffins on 5 April. He played two games with the Red Wings, recording four shots in 13:08 average time on ice. During the 2016–17 season, he ranked third on the Griffins with 20 goals and 31 assists in 74 regular-season games and added five goals and seven assists in 19 playoff games, to help lead the Griffins to the Calder Cup.

On 8 March 2018, Svechnikov was recalled by the Red Wings. After producing just five points over the Griffins's first 26 games this season, Svechnikov has recorded five goals and 12 assists in 25 games since 30 December 2017, including eight points in his last 11 games. On 20 March, Svechnikov scored his first career NHL goal against Petr Mrázek of the Philadelphia Flyers. On 4 April, Svechnikov was assigned to the Griffins. He appeared in 14 games for the Red Wings, posting two goals, two assists, eight penalty minutes, 15 shots on goal, 15 hits and six blocked shots.

On 16 October 2018, Svechnikov underwent anterior cruciate ligament reconstruction surgery on his right knee due to an injury he sustained in the Red Wings final preseason game against the Toronto Maple Leafs on 29 September 2018. He missed the entire 2018–19 season.

On 6 August 2020, Svechnikov accepted his qualifying offer and re-signed a one-year contract with the Red Wings. On 12 January 2021, the Red Wings assigned Svechnikov to the Grand Rapids Griffins. In the  season, on 16 February 2021, Svechnikov was reassigned to the Red Wings. Prior to being recalled by the Red Wings, he recorded one goal and one assist in three games for the Griffins.

Following his sixth season within the Red Wings organization, after which he was still struggling to make a name for himself in the NHL, Svechnikov was not tendered a qualifying offer by the Red Wings, making him an unrestricted free agent. Unable to secure an NHL contract, Svechnikov on 20 August 2021 was signed to a one-year AHL contract with the Manitoba Moose, the primary affiliate to the Winnipeg Jets. After a successful training camp with the Jets, Svechnikov then signed a one-year NHL contract.

After the Jets didn't send a qualifying offer to Svechnikov, Svechnikov as a free agent agreed to terms on a one-year, two-way, $750,000 contract with the San Jose Sharks on 4 September 2022.

International play

Svechnikov represented Russia at the 2013 World U-17 Hockey Challenge, where he recorded seven goals and one assist in six games, and won a silver medal. Svechnikov represented Russia at the 2016 World Junior Ice Hockey Championships, where he won a silver medal.

Personal
Svechnikov was born in Neftegorsk, Sakhalin Oblast, Russia, but following the 1995 Neftegorsk earthquake his family moved to Barnaul. Evgeny's younger brother Andrei was drafted  in the first round of the 2018 NHL Entry Draft by the Carolina Hurricanes.

Career statistics

Regular season and playoffs

International

Awards and honours

References

External links

1996 births
Living people
Ak Bars Kazan players
Cape Breton Screaming Eagles players
Detroit Red Wings draft picks
Detroit Red Wings players
Expatriate ice hockey players in the United States
Expatriate ice hockey players in Canada
Grand Rapids Griffins players
Ice hockey players at the 2012 Winter Youth Olympics
JHC Bars players
National Hockey League first-round draft picks
People from Yuzhno-Sakhalinsk
Russian expatriate ice hockey people
Russian ice hockey right wingers
San Jose Sharks players
Sportspeople from Kazan
Winnipeg Jets players
Russian expatriate sportspeople in Canada
Russian expatriate sportspeople in the United States